Stewart E. Ruch III is an American Anglican bishop. He has been the first bishop of the Anglican Diocese of the Upper Midwest at the Anglican Church in North America, since his consecration on 28 September 2013. He is married to Katherine and they have six children.

He was raised as a high church Presbyterian and in the Charismatic movement, but he felt more attracted to Anglicanism when he joined Wheaton College and first read the Book of Common Prayer. He later had a spiritual crisis and only returned fully to the Christian faith in September 1991, thanks to the ministry of Fr. William Beasley, at the Church of the Resurrection in West Chicago, IL, and after severing many friendships from his Wheaton days.

He majored in English at Wheaton College, and was also actively involved in theater. He later earned a Master of Theology at Wheaton and won Wheaton's Kenneth Kantzer Prize for Theology.

He has been the rector of the Church of the Resurrection, which relocated to Wheaton, Illinois, since 1999. He left the Episcopal Church, because of disagreements with the leadership of the denomination and what he perceived as liberalism, particularly on the subject of homosexuality and sexual ethics, and particularly in the sermons and writings of the Bishop of Chicago Frank T. Griswold. Ruch then, in 1997, became pastor at the Church of the Resurrection following Canon William Beasley. Soon, he and others joined the new Anglican Church in North America, launched in June 2009.

Ruch was consecrated the first bishop of the Diocese of the Upper Midwest on 28 September 2013.

He and Baroness Caroline Cox escaped narrowly an ambush by Islamist Fulani herdsmen during a visit to Jos Plateau State, in Nigeria, on 14 November 2016.

Sexual Abuse Controversy 

In July 2021, Ruch went on leave after making what he called “regrettable errors” in handling cases of sexual abuse in the diocese. The leave of absence followed disclosures that Mark Rivera, lay catechist at Christ Our Light Anglican Church in Big Rock, Illinois, had been arrested in 2019 and charged with felony sexual assault and predatory abuse of a victim under 13 years of age. Since 2019, over a dozen survivors have come forward with accounts of abuse by Rivera. Their allegations included rape, assault, child sexual abuse, indecent exposure, and grooming. Rivera has also been charged with 2 counts of rape of another victim. 

Ruch waited nearly two years to tell the Diocese of Upper Midwest congregations about the allegations against Rivera, who had previously held multiple volunteer roles at Church of the Resurrection, where Ruch served as rector and then as bishop. Ruch’s mishandling of the allegations provoked not one but two parallel investigations — one into the accusations against Rivera and the diocese’s response and another into allegations that Ruch and other ACNA leaders had created a culture of coercion and control in the Diocese of the Upper Midwest. 

The investigations into Ruch and the diocese were spurred not only by the allegations against Rivera, but by the accountability efforts by abuse advocacy group ACNAtoo. ACNAtoo formed in June 2021 when Joanna Rudenborg took to Twitter and alleged that she had been raped twice by ACNA catechist Mark Rivera and decried the subsequent mishandling of multiple survivors’ allegations by leadership in the Diocese of the Upper Midwest.

The mother of the young girl assaulted by Rivera filed a lawsuit on May 18, 2022 in Kane County, Illinois, against Christ Our Light Anglican Church. The lawsuit argues that the young girl, who is referred to as Jane Doe, experienced mental anguish and emotional and physical pain because of the church’s negligence, and requests over $50,000 in damages. The lawsuit also names several other ACNA entities as respondents in discovery, including the Diocese of the Upper Midwest, Church of the Resurrection (the diocesan cathedral where Rivera previously attended and volunteered), the Greenhouse Movement (the church planting organization that oversaw Christ Our Light Anglican) and the Anglican Church in North America. The case is co-counseled by longtime sexual abuse attorney Boz Tchividjian and Chicago attorney Evan Smola.

References

External links
Meet Bishop Stewart Ruch of the Diocese of the Upper Midwest, ACNA Official Website

Living people
Bishops of the Anglican Church in North America
Year of birth missing (living people)